The Colour of My Love Tour is the fifth concert tour by Celine Dion. The tour was organized to support her third English-language and twelfth studio album  The Colour of My Love (1993).

History
The set list included mainly songs from The Colour of My Love and Dion's previous English albums. But there were also few French songs and covers of "Calling You", "River Deep,Mountain High", and "Can't Help Falling in Love."

At first, Dion performed 2 concerts in September 1993 in Quebec City, Canada, which were later used for the TV specials and a home video release, The Colour of My Love Concert. Another 2 concerts in Quebec were performed in November 1993, to mark the release of a new album.

However, the real tour started on 11 February 1994 in San Francisco, United States. After 10 concerts in the United States, Dion went on the Canadian sold out leg of the tour, which included 6 concerts in the Montreal Forum and a show before 10,000 people in Hamilton among others.

Between 26 April and 1 May 1994 Dion sang in Tokyo and Osaka, Japan at the David Foster tribute concerts. They were recorded for a TV special: JT Super Producers 94. Dion sang "The Power of Love", "Beauty and the Beast" (with Peabo Bryson) and "Love Lights the World" (with Bryson and Color Me Badd). The shows were staged and directed by Tony Greco. Three concerts between 26 and 28 April were performed in Nippon Budokan, and one on 1 May in Osaka-jō Hall.

From 8 June to 27 August 1994, Céline Dion toured the United States with Michael Bolton on his "The One Thing Tour". They performed in twenty-thousand-seat-arenas, and in the "sheds" that open onto natural amphitheaters. It was their second, sold-out tour.

In September/October 1994, Dion performed few shows in Europe, including 3 concerts at the L'Olympia in France, at these shows, Celine sang an alternative version of "The Power of Love". In November she gave another 3 shows in Canada, and in December 1994 she sang in Japan, this time with her own show.

Dion also toured Europe again in May 1995, including a sold-out concert at Hammersmith Apollo, London.

Opening acts
 Paul Wayne (United States)
 Kathleen Sergerie (Canada, March–April) 
 The Barra MacNeils
 Mario Pelchat (Canada)
 Marc Dupré (France)

Setlist

 "Everybody's Talkin' My Baby Down"
 "Des mots qui sonnent"
 "Where Does My Heart Beat Now"
 "L'amour existe encore" 
 "If You Asked Me To"
 "Only One Road"
 "Beauty and the Beast"
 "Misled"
 "Le blues du businessman"
 "Ce n'était qu'un rêve" 1
 "Je danse dans ma tête"1
 "Refuse To Dance"
 "Unison"
 "When I Fall in Love"
 "Think Twice"
 "River Deep,Mountain High"
 "Love Can Move Mountains"
 "The Colour of My Love"
 "The Power Of Love"
 "Can't Help Falling in Love"
1Performed on select nights

 "Des mots qui sonnent"
 "Where Does My Heart Beat Now"
 "L'amour existe encore"
 "Je danse dans ma tête"
 "Beauty and the Beast"
 "Misled"
 "Calling You"
 "Elle"
 "Oxygène"
 Medley Starmania:
"Quand on arrive en ville"
"Les uns contre les autres"
"Le monde est stone"
"Naziland, ce soir on danse"
 "Le blues du businessman"
 "Le fils de superman"
 "River Deep,Mountain High"
 "Love Can Move Mountains"
 "Un garçon pas comme les autres (Ziggy)"
 "The Power Of Love"
 "Quand on n'a que l'amour"

 "Everybody's Talkin' My Baby Down"
 "Where Does My Heart Beat Now"
 "If You Asked Me To"
 "Only One Road"
 "Beauty and the Beast"
 "Misled"
 "Calling You"
 "L'amour existe encore" 
 "Je danse dans ma tête"1
 "Pour que tu m'aimes encore"2
 "Unison"
 "When I Fall in Love"
 "Think Twice"
 "River Deep,Mountain High"
 "Love Can Move Mountains"
 "The Colour of My Love"
 "The Power Of Love"
 "Can't Help Falling in Love"
1Performed on select nights
2Performed during the final May 1995 leg of the tour

Tour dates

Broadcasts and recordings

Before the tour, 7–8 September 1993 concerts at Le Théàtre Capitole, Quebec City, Canada were filmed and aired at CTV in December 1993 and the Disney Channel in February 1994. The concerts were conceived, staged and directed by Tony Greco. They were used for The Colour of My Love Concert home video.

In 28 and 29 September 1994, during a series of sold-out shows at the Paris Olympia, France, Céline Dion recorded a live album. It was released at the end of the year, under the title À l'Olympia. However, the video was never released.

Personnel
Band
Musical director: Claude "Mego" Lemay
Drums: Dominique Messier
Bass: Jeff Myers
Keyboards: Yves Frulla
Guitars: André Coutu
Backing vocals: Sisandra Myers, Janice Thompson, Terry Bradford, Elise Duguay

Production
Tour director: Tony Greco
Director of operations: Lloyd Brault
Production manager: Ian Donald
Tour accountant: Sylvia Hebel
Sound engineer: Danis Savage
Monitor engineer: Daniel Baron
System engineer: François Desjardins
Lighting director: Yves Aucoin
Moving light operator: Normand Chassé
Equipment manager: Jean-François Dubois
Equipment assistant: Serge Lacasse
Tour assistant: Patrick Angélil
Tour assistant: Michel Dion
Tour assistant: Louise Labranche
Chauffeurs: Marc Deschamp, Jacques Riopel
Bodyguard: Eric Burrows
Hair: Louis Hechter

References

Celine Dion concert tours
1994 concert tours
1995 concert tours